Aydın Province is a province of southwestern Turkey, located in the Aegean Region. The provincial capital is the city of Aydın which has a population of almost 200,000 (2012). Other towns in the province include the summer seaside resorts of Didim and Kuşadası.

Geography
Neighboring provinces are Manisa to the north east, İzmir to the north, Denizli to the east, Muğla to the south.

The central and western parts of the province are fertile plains watered by the largest river in the Aegean region the Büyük Menderes River, with the Aydın Mountains to the north and the Menteşe Mountains to the south. The western end of the province is the Aegean coast with Lake Bafa a major feature of the Menderes delta area. The climate is typical of the Aegean region, very hot in summer. The Germencik region contains a number of hot springs.

Districts

Aydın province is divided into 17 districts:

Flora
Much of the countryside is a
mix of fig, olive and citrus trees, especially figs.

Economy
The major sources of income are agriculture and tourism.

Tourism

The coastal towns of Didim and Kuşadası in particular are tourist resorts. Kuşadası is near to the Dilek Peninsula - Büyük Menderes Delta National Park, while Didim has a temple of Apollo, beaches, and the ancient ruins of Miletos nearby. The province contains archeological sites, including the ancient Carian cities of Alinda and Alabanda.

Agriculture

Aydın is Turkey's leading producer of figs and exports dried figs worldwide. The very name by which the fruit was called in the world markets was "Smyrna figs" until recently, due to the preponderance of figs exported from İzmir over other species of the genus. But İzmir got the name by being the center for the wholesale trade and exports, while in fact the fruit was traditionally cultivated in Aydın. The term used within Turkey is "Aydın figs". Turkey's yearly production of roughly 50,000 tons of dried figs, is almost all from Aydın, Within Aydın province, the best figs are reputed to be grown in Germencik. Aydın produces olives from the varieties of Memecik, Manzanilla, and Gemlik, as well as chestnuts, cotton, citrus fruits, water melons and other fruits.

Orange and tangerine cultivation has increased in Aydın in recent years.

Industry
Aydın has some light industry

Adnan Menderes University was built in the city of Aydın in 1990s and has branches throughout the province.

Places of interest

The city of Aydın has a number of antique ruins and Ottoman period mosques. The province's countryside and scenery include a stretch of the Aegean coast and a number of historic sites including:
 Didim coastal resort with large temple of Apollo and nearby
 Miletus ruins of an Ancient Greek city
 Ilyas Bey Complex, a cultural heritage of Turkey built in 1403
 Kuşadası coastal resort, near to the Dilek Peninsula - Büyük Menderes Delta National Park
 Kirazli - a traditional Turkish village with old stone houses
 Alinda - ancient ruins
 Harpasa - ancient city in Nazilli and Arpaz Castle, also known as Arpaz Beyler Mansion.
 Alabanda - ancient ruins
 Magnesia ad Maeandrum - ancient ruins, on the Ortaklar-Söke road in Germencik
 Nysa - another ruined Carian city, in Sultanhisar
 Aphrodisias - more ancient ruins, including tombs, friezes and sculpture, in Karacasu
 Priene - another ruin, near Söke
 Mycale Mountains

Culture
Aydın is the home of the Zeybek folk art. This involves a special type of war dance which is performed in a ring to resemble birds.  The Zeybek is performed to sounds of the Kiteli and other Turkish folk instruments.

The folk songs of Aydın are famously short, indeed a popular saying in the Aegean region to get someone to stop talking, is Keep it short, make it an Aydın tune.

The cuisine features the typical Turkish pastries, köfte and kebab.

Transport

Roads
Izmir to Aydın motorway, Motorway O-31, was built in the 1990s and is the city's main thoroughfare. An extension of this motorway to Denizli is currently under construction, with longer-term plans to extend it to Antalya.

Railway
There is a passenger train service passing through Aydın, connecting the city to Izmir and Denizli. This passenger train runs five trains per day.

Notable people 

 Mustafa Kemal Atatürk - the Republic of Turkey founder and the first President of Turkey
 Atçalı Kel Mehmet Efe, folk hero, leader of a public revolt during the decline of the Ottoman Empire
 Yörük Ali Efe, hero of the Turkish War of Independence
 Demirci Mehmet Efe, the hero for Kuva-yi Milliye and Turkish War of Independence
 Ali Rıza Efendi, the Ataturk's father
 Makbule Atadan, the Ataturk's sister
 Adnan Menderes, Turkish Prime Minister (1950-1960)
 Gökhan Kırdar, musician, composer and producer
 Fatih Portakal, journalist
 Ümit Aktan, TV speaker
 Şebnem Bursalı, journalist
 Aydın Menderes, politician and Adnan Menderes's son
 Yüksel Yalova, politician
 Melike Yalova, actress
 Necati Çelim, MP for Aydın, doctor, founding Chairman of Aydın Tekstil Fabrikası, born in Köşk
 İlhan Selçuk, editor of the Cumhuriyet newspaper
 İsmet Sezgin, former minister
 Atilla Koç, MP for Aydın, former minister of culture and tourism, born in Köşk
 Güven Önüt, former Beşiktaş footballer
 Rıdvan Dilmen, retired footballer, team manager and sports commentator

See also
 List of populated places in Aydın Province

References

External links

  Aydın governor's official website
  Aydın municipality's official website
 Aydın weather forecast information
  Local information
  Aydın figs information
  Aydın otelleri

 
Ancient Greek geography